Vision Racing was an American professional stock car racing team that last competed in the NASCAR Xfinity Series and the ARCA Re/Max Series. The team last fielded the No. 17 Toyota Camry for Benny Gordon in the NASCAR Xfinity Series. The team previously used Dodge Challenger cars and engines previously run by Team Penske before 2012, as well as Toyotas from Joe Gibbs Racing. After Tanner Berryhill failed to qualify Daytona Xfinity race in 2015, the team decided to shut down due to lack of sponsorship, running its final race at Talladega in May with Benny Gordon.

Following Talladega, Gordon and business partner Larry Mostoller purchased the team to form Performance Energy Group.

History
Vision Racing ran in the ARCA Racing Series in 2005, running  at Nashville and Kentucky with Zach Chappel and at Pocono with Damon Lusk. Lusk also ran the season opening ARCA race at Daytona in 2006. Will Vaught ran a No. 13 car at Kansas, then the No. 37 at Gateway. The team began running the No. 37 Chevy in the then-Busch Series in 2006, debuting with Josh Krug at Richmond International Raceway in September. Randy LaJoie drove at Kansas in September and Texas in November, before Krug ran at Phoenix.

In 2010, Berryhill ran the ARCA race at Iowa in the No. 7 Nation Cash Lenders Chevy. In 2011, he ran 7 races in the K&N Pro Series East in the No. 97 Chevy.

2012
The Nationwide team did not run again until 2012. At Richmond in April, J. J. Yeley ran the No. 17 Toyota Camry, while Tanner Berryhill ran the No. 24 Chevrolet Impala, both with sponsorship from New Gulf Resources. Berryhill finished 29th while Yeley finished 37th. Berryhill ran three more races in the No. 17 with a best finish of 26th at Chicago.

2013

The team ran the No. 17 and No. 37 in a limited schedule with sponsorship from National Cash Lenders. Berryhill ran 5 races in the 17 and one in the No. 37. Matt DiBenedetto ran 5 races in the No. 37. The team's best finish was a 28th at Richmond in April with Berryhill. Midway through the season, the team switched to Dodge, which had pulled factory support from NASCAR, and began running R6 engines from former Dodge team Team Penske at Charlotte.

2014

In 2014, Tanner Berryhill ran the full season for Rookie of the Year in the No. 17. BWP Bats sponsored the first six races of the season. The 17 and DiBenedetto in the No. 37 both missed the season opener at Daytona. At Talladega, Chad Boat and Billy Boat Motorsports missed the race, then made a deal to run the 17 in the race using their own car, finishing 25th. At Mid-Ohio, Berryhill got the team's best finish of 2014 with a lead-lap finish of 17th.

Ryan Ellis tweeted on August 19 that he would run the No. 37 car at Bristol, but failed to qualify. Berryhill would finish 22nd in points.

2015
The No. 17 and Berryhill planned to run the full 2015 season pending sponsorship, with the team purchasing Toyota Camrys from Joe Gibbs Racing. After crashing in qualifying for the season opener at Daytona, however, the team shut down due to financial woes. The team was later put up for sale by owner Adrian Berryhill.

In April, the team announced it would be fielding the 17 Toyota at Talladega in May, if a driver with $45,000 of sponsorship funds could be found. The car would be run by Benny Gordon and VSI Racing, qualifying 25th and finishing 13th. Gordon has since bought the team and rebranded it as PEG Racing.

Car No. 17 results

Car No. 37 results

References

External links
 
 
 

Defunct NASCAR teams